Sebastião Marcos Barbosa de Oliveira (born 21 June 1976), known as Marcos, is a Brazilian former professional footballer who played as a goalkeeper.

Club career
Born in Siqueira Campos, Paraná, Marcos started his career with local Paraná Clube, appearing regularly during six years. In January 2003 he moved abroad, joining Portugal's C.S. Marítimo; a starter from his beginnings, he made his Primeira Liga debut in a 0–1 away loss against Vitória de Setúbal, and went on to draw comparisons to compatriot Everton Machado who played in the island of Madeira from 1988 to 1996 with great success.

In the 2004–05 season, as Marítimo finished seventh with one of the strongest defensive records, Marcos was named Goalkeeper of the Year in the country. He continued to be the undisputed starter until his departure in 2009, at 33.

In July 2010, after one year in Italy with lowly A.C. Renate, Marcos returned to Portugal and signed with S.C. Braga, as the club had lost Eduardo and Paweł Kieszek in the off-season. He was released by the Minho side in early January 2012, with only one competitive appearance to his credit, a 4–0 away win against F.C. Arouca in the 2010–11 edition of the League Cup.

After being released by Braga, 36-year-old Marcos joined C.D. Feirense of the second level. He returned to his first club Paraná the following transfer window, achieving promotion to the Série A in 2017 and retiring immediately after; during his two spells, he appeared in an all-time best 367 matches for the team based at the Estádio Vila Capanema.

References

External links
CBF data 
Futpédia profile 

1976 births
Living people
Sportspeople from Paraná (state)
Brazilian footballers
Association football goalkeepers
Campeonato Brasileiro Série A players
Campeonato Brasileiro Série B players
Paraná Clube players
Primeira Liga players
Liga Portugal 2 players
C.S. Marítimo players
S.C. Braga players
C.D. Feirense players
A.C. Renate players
Brazilian expatriate footballers
Expatriate footballers in Portugal
Expatriate footballers in Italy
Brazilian expatriate sportspeople in Portugal
Brazilian expatriate sportspeople in Italy